The North Carolina Tar Heels women's tennis team, commonly referred to as Carolina, represents the University of North Carolina at Chapel Hill in NCAA Division I college tennis. North Carolina currently competes as a member of the Atlantic Coast Conference (ACC) and plays its home matches at Cone-Kenfield Tennis Center.

History
The team's history in the NCAA Championships includes one runner-up finish in 2014 and seven appearances in the quarterfinals (2013, 2015, 2017, 2018, 2019, 2021, 2022). The Tar Heels have won the ITA National Team Indoor Championship seven times (2013, 2015, 2018, 2020, 2021, 2022, 2023). Additionally, the program boasts eleven ACC tournament championships.

The team is currently led by Brian Kalbas, UNC’s all-time wins leader. Kalbas compiled an .836 career winning percentage (513 out of 614 matches) over his first 20 seasons at North Carolina, the highest in ACC history.

Notable former players
Jamie Loeb
Hayley Carter

Honors

Individual NCAA Champions
Jamie Loeb (2015)

Doubles NCAA Champions
Jenna Long/Sara Anundsen (2007)
Makenna Jones/Elizabeth Scotty (2021)

All-Americans

Cinda Gurney (1992, 1993)
Alisha Portnoy (1993)
Marlene Mejia (2001)
Kate Pinchbeck (2002, 2003)
Kendall Cline (2003, 2005)
Aniela Mojzis (2003, 2004, 2005)
Sara Anundsen (2006, 2007)
Jenna Long (2006, 2007)
Sanaz Marand (2008, 2009)
Sophie Grabinski (2009)
Zoe De Bruycker (2011)
Shinann Featherston (2011, 2012)
Lauren McHale (2011, 2012)
Caroline Price (2013, 2014)
Gina Suarez-Malaguti (2013)
Hayley Carter (2014, 2015, 2016, 2017)
Jamie Loeb (2014, 2015)
Whitney Kay (2014, 2016)
Sara Daavettila (2017, 2018, 2019, 2020, 2021)
Jessie Aney (2017, 2018)
Makenna Jones (2018, 2019, 2021)
Alexa Graham (2018, 2019, 2020, 2021)
Alle Sanford (2018)
Cameron Morra (2019, 2020, 2021)
Elizabeth Scotty (2021)

ITA National Coach of the Year
2010: Brian Kalbas

Information about honors and former players cited from the 2019 team yearbook

References

 
Women